Juaben Municipal District is one of the forty-three districts in Ashanti Region, Ghana. Originally it was formerly part of the then-larger Ejisu-Juaben Municipal District in 1988, which was created from the former Ejisu-Juaben-Bosomtwe District Council, until the northeast part of the district was split off to create Juaben Municipal District on 15 March 2018; thus the remaining part has been renamed as Ejisu Municipal District. The municipality is located in the central part of Ashanti Region and has Juaben as its capital town.

References

Sources 
 
 GhanaDistricts.com

Districts of Ashanti Region